Mehmed Kâmil Pasha ("Mehmed Kamil Pasha the Cypriot"), also spelled as Kiamil Pasha (1833 – 14 November 1913), was an Ottoman statesman and liberal politician of Turkish Cypriot origin in the late-19th-century and early-20th-century. He was the Grand Vizier of the Empire during four different periods.

Biography 

He was born in Nicosia in 1833, son of Captain Salih Ağa from the village of Pyrogi, in Cyprus. His first post was in the household of the Khedive of Egypt who at that time was only nominally dependent to the central Ottoman power in Constantinople. In the course of this appointment he visited London for the Great Exhibition of 1851 in charge of one of the Khedive's sons. Kiamil's sojourn in London left in him a lifelong admiration for Britain and during his career within the Ottoman state, he was always known to be an Anglophile.

Having full command of English, thenceforth to the close of his career he zealously sought the friendship of the United Kingdom for the Ottomans.

After remaining in Egypt for ten years, Mehmed Kamil exchanged the service of Abbas I for that of the Ottoman Government as of 1860 and for the ensuing nineteen years – that is to say until he first entered the Cabinet – he filled very numerous administrative appointments in every part of the Empire. He governed, or helped to govern provinces such as Eastern Rumelia, Hercegovina, Kosovo, and his native Cyprus.

Career 

His periods in office as premier were:

 from 25 September 1885 to 4 September 1891, under Abdülhamid II's reign,
 from 2 October 1895 to 7 November 1895, under Abdülhamid II's reign,
 from 5 August 1908 to 14 February 1909, under Abdülhamid II's reign and during the Second Constitutional Era in the Ottoman Empire,
 and from 29 October 1912 to 23 January 1913, under Mehmed V Reşad's reign and during the Second Constitutional Era of the Ottoman Empire.

In May 1913, he returned to his native Cyprus which he had not seen since he had ceased to govern it as far back as 1864.

The reason was no happy one. After the Young Turk Revolution of 1908, Kamil initially had tried to compromise with the new men in power. But soon he decided to oppose the Committee of Union and Progress (CUP) and became a figurehead of the more liberal and pro-decentralization opposition group of Young Turks, known as the Freedom and Accord Party (also Liberal Union or Entente). After the overthrow of the CUP regime in summer 1912 by the Savior Officers, he became Grand Vizier of the new Freedom and Accord Party government. He was appointed Grand Vizier for his friendly relations with the British (he was often known as İngiliz Kamil, or "English Kamil", for his Anglophilia), in the hopes that he would be able to get favorable terms for the end of the ongoing, disastrous First Balkan War (since the victorious Bulgaria's foreign interests were represented by the British). In January 1913, Kamil's government decided to accept severe peace conditions including massive territorial losses.

The CUP in the military forces used this pretext for their second coup d'état on 23 January 1913. That day, Enver Bey, one of the CUP's military leaders, burst with some of his associates into the Sublime Porte while the Cabinet was in session. By most accounts, one of Enver's officers, Yakup Cemil, shot the Minister of War Nazım Pasha and the group pressed Kamil Pasha to resign immediately at gunpoint.

Kamil was put under house arrest and surveillance. The ex-Grand Vizier (who probably was in danger of life) was invited by his British friend Lord Kitchener to stay with him in Cairo. After three months in Egypt, Mehmed Kamil Pasha decided to wait a favourable turn of fortune in his native Cyprus.

Five weeks after his return to Cyprus, the assassination of his CUP successor to the premiership, Mahmud Shevket Pasha, occurred in June 1913, by a relative of Nazım Pasha to avenge his death. The CUP regime reacted with persecution of well-known opposition politicians. Djemal Pasha, then the CUP prefect of the capital Constantinople, indicated to Kamil's family that he had to leave the Ottoman Empire or he too would be arrested. His family joined his exile.

On 14 November 1913, while full of plans for revisiting England in 1914, Kamil Pasha suddenly died of syncope and was buried in the court of the Arab Ahmet Mosque.

Sir Ronald Storrs, British Governor of Cyprus from 1926 to 1932, caused a memorial to be raised over Kamil Pasha's grave. He also composed the English inscription, carved on the headstone below a Turkish one in old lettering. It runs as follows:

His Highness Kiamil Pasha 
Son of Captain Salih Agha of Pyroi 
Born in Nicosia in 1833 
Treasury Clerk 
Commissioner of Larnaca 
Director of Evqaf 
Four times Grand Vizier of the Ottoman Empire 
A Great Turk and 
A Great Man.

See also
 List of Ottoman Grand Viziers

Sources

 Cyprus by Sir Harry Luke for a short biography of Kamil Pasha and a moving account of his funeral

External links
 

Kibrisli Mehmed Kamil Pasa
Kibrisli Mehmed Kamil Pasa
Kibrisli Mehmed Kamil Pasha
Kibrisli Mehmed Kamil Pasha
Kibrisli Mehmed Kamil Pasha
Kibrisli Mehmed Kamil Pasa
19th-century Grand Viziers of the Ottoman Empire
Ottoman people of the Balkan Wars
Ottoman governors of Aidin
Ottoman governors of Cyprus